Fel Andar is a DC Comics character who also called himself Hawkman. There are two different versions of Fel Andar: the pre-Hawkworld version (named Fell Andar) was created by Tony Isabella and Richard Howell, while the post-Hawkworld version was created by John Ostrander and Graham Nolan.

Fel Andar was created after DC Comics rebooted the Hawkman character after publication of the 1989 Hawkworld miniseries, as a stand-in for Katar Hol in Katar's post-Crisis, pre-Hawkworld adventures, including his brief membership with Justice League International.

Fictional character biography

Pre-Hawkworld
First appearing in The Shadow War of Hawkman, Thanagarian agent Fell Andar led a team to Earth to steal the Hawks' technology. Thanagar has at this time become a fascist empire and was planning to take over the universe, starting with Earth.  Since they lost their technology during the Equalizer plague, the Hawks were the only ones who possessed them as they were off-planet. Andar took control of the Hawks' spaceship.  The Hawks manage to sabotage the ship and crashed.  The Hawks battled Andar and emerged victorious.

Later, in Hawkman Special #1, the ghost of Andar appears in Katar Hol's dream while he was getting over the recent deaths of Mavis Trent, the Gentleman Ghost and several others.

Post-Hawkworld
Years before the events told in the Invasion! story arc, Fel Andar, a Thanagarian spy on Earth, fell in love with an Earth woman, Sharon Parker. They married and Sharon gave birth to Ch'al Andar, translated to the terran name Charley. When Charley was four years old, Thanagar called Andar to active duty by ordering him to infiltrate the Justice League as the second Hawkman.

He never told his superiors of his son. They mindwiped Sharon, forcing her to take the identity of Hawkwoman.

Intending to gain his teammates' confidence, Andar claimed to be Carter and Shiera Hall's son Carter Hall, Jr. He was actually working for the future alien alliance. When Hawkwoman learned about the masquerade she exposed the truth to the Martian Manhunter and Maxwell Lord. Confronted by both, Andar escaped back to Thanagar but not before murdering Sharon for her betrayal.

Fel Andar wanted to stay on Earth but was forced to return to his planet by Carter Hall's return from Limbo. Andar was sentenced to life imprisonment on Thanagar and left his young son behind. Andar appeared two more times in his son's life. He placed the battlesuit Charley would use as Golden Eagle so that it could be easily "discovered" by Adam Strange. It was Andar, not the Nth metal in Charley's uniform, that saved him from drowning at the hand of the Wildebeest Society during the Titans Hunt storyline. During the second encounter with his son, Andar was recaptured and returned to Thanagar.

Death
During the events of the Rann-Thanagar War, while trying to make up with his son and redeem himself for his own crimes, Andar died at Komand'r's hands.

See also
 Golden Eagle
 Hawkwoman

References

Characters created by Richard Howell
Characters created by Tony Isabella
Characters created by Graham Nolan
Characters created by John Ostrander
Comics characters introduced in 1985
Comics characters introduced in 1992
DC Comics aliens
DC Comics characters with superhuman strength
DC Comics extraterrestrial supervillains
DC Comics supervillains
Wingmen of Thanagar
Hawkman